Warwick District Council elections are held every four years. Warwick District Council is the local authority for the non-metropolitan district of Warwick in Warwickshire, England. Since the last boundary changes in 2019, 44 councillors have been elected from 17 wards.

Political control
The first election to the council was held in 1973, initially operating as a shadow authority before coming into its powers on 1 April 1974. Since 1974 political control of the council has been held by the following parties:

Leadership
The leaders of the council since 1995 have been:

Council elections
1973 Warwick District Council election
1976 Warwick District Council election
1979 Warwick District Council election
1983 Warwick District Council election (New ward boundaries)
1987 Warwick District Council election
1991 Warwick District Council election
1995 Warwick District Council election (District boundary changes took place but the number of seats remained the same)
1999 Warwick District Council election
2003 Warwick District Council election (New ward boundaries increased the number of seats by 1)
2007 Warwick District Council election (Some new ward boundaries) 
2011 Warwick District Council election
2015 Warwick District Council election (New ward boundaries)
2019 Warwick District Council election (New ward boundaries)

By-election results

1995-1999

1999-2003

2003-2007

2007-2011

2015-2019

2019-2023

Town Council by-elections

2019-2023

References

External links
Warwick District Council

 
Council elections in Warwickshire
Warwick District
District council elections in England